Helmholtz Zentrum München Deutsches Forschungszentrum für Gesundheit und Umwelt (GmbH), also known as Helmholtz Munich, is a member of the Helmholtz Association of German Research Centres. It was founded in 1960 and is a joint venture by the Federal Ministry of Education and Research and Bavarian State Ministry of Finance and Home.

Mission
The mission of Helmholtz Munich is to find new personalized medical solutions for the prevention, diagnosis and therapy of environmentally triggered diseases to promote a healthier society in a rapidly changing world.

Management
Prof. Dr. H. Matthias Tschöp has been the Scientific Director and Chief Executive Officer of the Center since 2018.
In 2019 Kerstin Günther joined the Center and is now the Chief Financial and Technology Officer.

Campus
The main campus is located in Neuherberg, a district of Oberschleißheim, right outside of Munich’s city borders. The campus has a size of 52.3 hectares. In addition, the Center maintains research facilities inside the city area of Munich, Augsburg, Tübingen, Hanover, Dresden and Leipzig.

Legal form
Helmholtz Zentrum München is a limited liability company according to German law and is financed by a ratio of 90:10 by its two shareholders, the Federal Government and the Free State of Bavaria.

Research focus 
The Center focuses its research on five key areas:

 Metabolic Health
 Environmental Health
 Molecular Targets and Therapies
 Cell Programming and Repair
 Bioengineering and Digital Health

Helmholtz Pioneer Campus (HPC) 
HPC is an innovation campus where young investigators research for novel solutions in the fields of biomedical sciences, engineering and digitization in the research environment of Helmholtz Munich.

Translational and clinical projects 
Translational research approaches at the Center are developed in cooperation with clinical partners:

 Diabetes Study Center
 Comprehensive Pneumology Center
 Center of Allergy and Environment

Career development 
The Center has one Helmholtz Graduate School (HELENA) in cooperation with the Ludwig Maximilian University of Munich (LMU) and the Technical University Munich (TUM), and five Helmholtz Research Schools. The schools offer doctoral students in-depth research in the fields of diabetes, lung and radiation research, epigenetics and data science:

 Helmholtz Graduate School Environmental Health (HELENA)
 International Helmholtz Research School for Diabetes
 EpiCrossBorders: International Helmholtz-Edinburgh Research School for Epigenetics
 CPC-Research School Lung Biology and Disease
 Helmholtz Research School of Radiation Science
 Munich School for Data Science

References

External links
 Official website

Medical research institutes in Germany
Medical and health organisations based in Bavaria